The Hummingbird Project is a 2018 thriller drama film about high-frequency trading and ultra-low latency direct market access, written and directed by Kim Nguyen produced by Pierre Even at Item 7. It stars Jesse Eisenberg, Alexander Skarsgård, Michael Mando, Sarah Goldberg, and Salma Hayek.

It had its world premiere at the 2018 Toronto International Film Festival on September 8, 2018. It was released in the United States on March 15, 2019, by The Orchard and was released on March 22, 2019, in Canada by Elevation Pictures.

Plot
The film opens as stockbroker Vincent Zaleski pitches Bryan Taylor on investing in a fiberoptic cable from Kansas electronic exchange to the New York Stock Exchange in order to more quickly execute (it likely isn't front running so long as it is public information more quickly) orders in a new high-frequency trading (HFT) operation. Taylor buys into the idea. Meanwhile, Vincent and his cousin Anton Zaleski are still employed by Eva Torres, where Anton programs trading software. Eva is also working on several ideas for HFT. Soon enough, Anton and Vincent quit, infuriating Eva. She insists that any code Anton created for her firm belongs to it, and even the thoughts in his head might be proprietary.

Vincent has hired Mark Vega to oversee the building of the fiberoptic cable tunnel. Vincent occasionally helps Mark purchase or lease the rights to land in order to make the cable as straight as possible. Any deviation in the shape of the tunnel will create delays in the trade. Anton is hard at work trying to shave 1 millisecond off the time it takes to transmit orders to NYC. Currently, his software will do it in 17 milliseconds, which is not fast enough to be competitive. It needs to be at most 16 milliseconds to be a viable enterprise for Taylor's firm.

Eva finds an NYU student who has written a paper about microwave pulses to effect HFT. She hires him, and starts the process of building a series of towers to make trades with microwaves. As Vincent struggles with acquiring land, being diagnosed with cancer, and broken drill bits, Eva manages to finish her microwave towers first, dominating the market.

Eva also takes revenge on Anton by having him arrested by the FBI for stock market fraud by using stolen property in the form of the software that he wrote for her company. While Anton is in jail, a software bug that Anton left in Eva's software as an insurance policy is released; this results in a 20 millisecond slowdown in her trading, rendering her microwaves useless. She subsequently drops Anton's charges after reaching a detente with Anton in exchange for learning how to fix the bug.

As Vincent undergoes chemotherapy, Anton reveals his next idea for HFT involves neutrino messaging, believing it could cut the time from Kansas City to NYC down to as little as 9 milliseconds.

Cast

 Jesse Eisenberg as Vincent Zaleski
 Alexander Skarsgård as Anton Zaleski
Salma Hayek as Eva Torres
Michael Mando as Mark Vega
Sarah Goldberg as Masha
 Anna Maguire as Jenny
 Frank Schorpion as Bryan Taylor
Johan Heldenbergh as Amish Elder
Kwasi Songui as Ray
 Ayisha Issa as Ophelia Troller

Production 
In May 2017, it was announced Jesse Eisenberg and Alexander Skarsgård had joined the cast of the film, with Kim Nguyen directing from a screenplay he wrote. Pierre Even served as a producer on the film, while Brian Kavanaugh-Jones and Fred Berger served as executive producers, under their Item 7, Automatik and HanWay Films banners, respectively. In September 2017, Salma Hayek joined the cast, followed in October 2017 by Michael Mando.

Principal photography began in Quebec in November 2017.

Release
The film had its world premiere at the Toronto International Film Festival on September 8, 2018, and was the opening gala at the Vancouver International Film Festival later that month. Shortly after, The Orchard acquired U.S. distribution rights to the film. It had a limited release in the United States on March 15, 2019.

Factual basis 
The communication systems portrayed in the film do exist. McKay Brothers and Tradeworx began providing microwave radio service in 2012.

Reception

Box office
The Hummingbird Project grossed $371,784 in the United States and Canada, and $527,253 in other territories, for a total worldwide gross of $899,037.

Critical response
The website's critical consensus reads, "Smart and well-acted, The Hummingbird Project marks a flawed yet undeniably intriguing addition to writer-director Kim Nguyen's filmography." On Metacritic, the film has a weighted average score of 58 out of 100, based on 26 critics, indicating "mixed or average reviews". Mike McCahill of The Guardian gave the film two stars out of five, stating "We get intriguing ideas, images and locations, and enough closeups of excavation equipment to enrapture plant-hire enthusiasts. With few narrative or thematic hook-ups, though, I guarantee plenty of head scratching in front of this curio". Odie Herderson of RogerEbert.com gave the movie two stars out of four, commenting "Though Nguyen is the only credited writer here, “The Hummingbird Project” feels like one of those movies where nine different people contributed to the proceedings without reading what anybody else wrote. I was ready to check out once we got to the major grab for sympathy (complete with hospital visit) that closes out the film. It's a shame because the acting is quite good here, especially an against-type Skarsgård. His Anton is rather complex and he gets one hell of a celebratory dance sequence. I identified with his little boogie-woogie; finally someone put onscreen what it feels like when your code does what it's supposed to do".

Ben Kenigsberg of The New York Times added "“The Hummingbird Project” may be too committed to its popcorn mechanics to double as a truly brainy exposé, but it pays other dividends. Eisenberg adds unexpected shades of humanity to his lizard persona from “The Social Network,” while a bald, unrecognizable Skarsgard pulls off the difficult feat of being sympathetically antisocial as a coder driven batty by his work. As the geological, financial and personal barriers the cousins face grow increasingly absurd, the movie works up a satisfying sweat". Jonathan Dean of GQ wrote, "But in its own way, the film winds up as Margin Call meets Glengarry Glen Ross meets, yes, The Social Network. And by harking back to the latter, the director has the Eisenberg we fell for. It has his twitch, but with a heart, the idea he is the smartest man in the room, but doesn't want people to know it".

See also
The Big Short

References

External links
 
 
 
 The Hummingbird Project at Library and Archives Canada

2018 films
Canadian thriller drama films
Films directed by Kim Nguyen
American thriller drama films
The Orchard (company) films
Trading films
2018 thriller drama films
English-language Canadian films
English-language Belgian films
2010s English-language films
2010s Canadian films
2010s American films